Pentakosiarch (in Modern Greek usually πεντακοσίαρχος, pentakosiarchos), meaning "commander of 500". is a Greek military rank.

Antiquity
It was first adopted in the infantry of the Army of Macedon (cf. Aelianus Tacticus and Plutarch, Life of Alexander, 76). The pentakosiarch commanded a pentakosiarchy (πεντακοσιαρχία, pentakosiarchia) of 512 men, composed of two syntagmata of 256. Two pentakosiarchies in turn formed a chiliarchy and were commanded by a chiliarch.

During the time of Alexander the Great, selection of the pentakosiarch was based on merit. An account, for instance, described a contest of valor at Sittakene for hypaspists where six pentakosiarch and three chiliarch were selected. 

In the Roman army, the equivalent of pentakosiarch was the primicerius, who led 512 men.

Modern Greece
The rank was revived for the irregular forces of the Greek rebels during the Greek War of Independence (1821–1829).

On 14 December 1868, a Royal Decree authorized the creation of thirty 'independent pentakosiarchies of volunteer light infantry' for the Greek Army, intended to serve as a militia. Numbered consecutively from 1 to 30, each was in turn composed of four hecatontarchies of 150 soldiers and 10 officers and NCOs each. With the pentakosiarchy commander and six other soldiers, including a flag-bearer, each pentakosiarchy numbered a total of 647 men.

References

Military ranks of Greece
Ancient Greek military terminology
Military ranks of ancient Macedon